Joseph Juneau (born January 5, 1968) is a Canadian former professional hockey player and engineer, born in Pont-Rouge, Quebec. He played  in the National Hockey League for the Boston Bruins, Washington Capitals, Buffalo Sabres, Ottawa Senators, Phoenix Coyotes and the Montreal Canadiens.

Playing career
As a youth, Juneau played in the 1979, 1980 and 1981 Quebec International Pee-Wee Hockey Tournaments with a minor ice hockey team from Pont-Rouge.

Originally drafted by the Bruins in the fourth round of the 1988 NHL Entry Draft, Juneau was a star college hockey player at Rensselaer Polytechnic Institute, where he scored 71 goals in four regular seasons and was a two-time All-American selection. He was well known for having a 4.0 grade point average and earning a degree in just three years in aeronautical engineering, despite the fact that he did not speak English when he first arrived in New York.

After college, Juneau spent a year with the Canadian Olympic team while disputing his contract offer from the Bruins. The sticking point was Juneau's insistence on being paid full salary even if he was sent to the minors - a demand Boston refused, having been burned in a nearly identical situation with Wes Walz the previous year.  Then-general manager Harry Sinden was famously quoted in response to Juneau's threat to play in Switzerland instead "Well, I hope he learns to yodel."  In the meantime, Juneau led Canada to a silver medal at the 1992 Albertville Games, and was the tournament's leading scorer.

Juneau would eventually sign with Boston on the team's terms, and Sinden's fears proved groundless. Juneau joined the Bruins' NHL roster right after the Olympics, and never spent a day in the minor leagues during his career. He had an impressive nineteen points in fourteen regular season games at the end of the 1992 season before a strong playoff.

His best season was his rookie year of 1992–93 with the Bruins, when, as the left winger on a powerful line with Adam Oates and Cam Neely, he had 32 goals and 102 points and set the NHL record for assists in a season by a left wing with 70, a mark Juneau held until 2022, when it was passed by Jonathan Huberdeau of the Florida Panthers. As a reward, he was named to the NHL All-Rookie Team.
Legend has it while with the Bruins, Juneau approached Bruins legend Johnny Bucyk asking if he could wear his No. 9 in Boston. Bucyk responded "Score 557 goals first, and then come talk to me."

During the 1993–94 season, the Bruins traded Juneau to the Capitals for Al Iafrate (who played only twelve games for Boston). In 1996, he became the first player ever to be awarded a penalty shot in overtime in a Stanley Cup playoff game (although he failed to score) during the second overtime of the Capitals' four-overtime loss to Pittsburgh. Juneau was also a member of the 1997–98 Capitals squad that reached the 1998 Stanley Cup Finals, scoring seventeen points in twenty-one playoff games. He scored the game-winning goal in overtime against the Buffalo Sabres in the 1998 Eastern Conference Finals that sent the Capitals to the Stanley Cup Finals. The next season, 1998–99, with the Capitals plagued by injuries and missing the playoffs, Juneau was traded to the Sabres, who reached the 1999 Stanley Cup Finals.

Juneau spent the 1999–2000 season with the Ottawa Senators, who signed him largely to fill the offensive gap created when Alexei Yashin was suspended for failing to honor his contract.

Juneau's offensive numbers steadily declined, largely due to chronic injuries. He became a journeyman, playing for five teams in four seasons before settling with the Montreal Canadiens as a third-liner for the final three seasons of his career. He announced his retirement after the 2003–04 NHL season.  Juneau finished with 156 goals and 416 assists for 572 points over thirteen seasons.

Juneau wore No. 90 for the majority of his career, and later admitted that his reason for choosing No. 90 was a result of his preferred No. 9 was either retired or worn by different players. The lone exception was during his stint with the Ottawa Senators when he wore No. 39. This was done as then general manager Pierre Gauthier had a policy in place where no player could wear a number higher than the goaltender. As Patrick Lalime wore No. 40, Juneau was unable to wear his customary No. 90, which he reverted to following a trade to the Phoenix Coyotes.

Post-retirement
After his playing career, Juneau became a partner and account manager at Quebec City-based Harfan Technologies. Rensselaer awarded Juneau an honorary degree at the school's 2005 commencement ceremonies, then named him as the second inductee into the Rensselaer "Ring of Honor" in November. Between 2005-2007, Juneau moved to Fairbanks, Alaska, where he helped promote hockey to the youth in the area before moving to Kuujjuaq, Quebec, on a permanent basis, where he heads a hockey program for Inuit youth in northern Quebec focused on encouraging academic progress, a contribution for which he received the 2007 La Presse/Radio-Canada Personality of the Year Award.  His involvement with the Nunavik hockey program ended in 2017.

Career statistics

Regular season and playoffs

International

See also
List of NHL players with 100-point seasons

Awards and honors

References

External links

No Average Joé
Rensselaer Polytechnic Institute News

1968 births
Living people
Boston Bruins draft picks
Boston Bruins players
Buffalo Sabres players
Canadian ice hockey centres
Ice hockey people from Quebec
Ice hockey players at the 1992 Winter Olympics
Knights of the National Order of Quebec
Medalists at the 1992 Winter Olympics
Montreal Canadiens players
Olympic ice hockey players of Canada
Olympic medalists in ice hockey
Olympic silver medalists for Canada
Ottawa Senators players
People from Capitale-Nationale
Phoenix Coyotes players
RPI Engineers men's ice hockey players
Rensselaer Polytechnic Institute alumni
Washington Capitals players
AHCA Division I men's ice hockey All-Americans